The Plain Dealer is a newspaper in Cleveland, Ohio.  The term "Plain Dealer" and variations may also refer to:

other newspapers
Alturas Plaindealer, newspaper in Alturas, California, from the mid-nineteenth century to 1952
The Plain Dealer (Kadina), newspaper in Kadina, South Australia (1894–1926)
Cresco Times Plain Dealer, newspaper in Cresco, Iowa
Ouray County Plaindealer, newspaper in Ouray, Colorado, established in 1877
Souris Plaindealer, newspaper in Souris, Manitoba (1892-2020)
Topeka Plaindealer, newspaper in Topeka, Kansas, serving the African American community (1899-1958)
Wabash Plain Dealer, newspaper in Wabash, Indiana, established in 1859

theatre
The Plain Dealer (play), theatrical play first performed in 1676

See also
Plain Dealer Pavilion